Leslie Peter Barrell (born 30 August 1932) is an English former footballer who played as a winger in the Football League for Colchester United.

Career

Born in Colchester, Barrell joined hometown club Colchester United on a professional basis in 1956, having played amateur football for Lexden Wanderers. He played briefly for Colchester's 'A' team in 1952–53, but switched between Layer Road and Harwich & Parkeston a number of times before finally becoming squad member. He scored on his debut for the U's in the Essex derby against Southend United, his only goal for the club, in a 3–2 home victory on 18 August 1956. He signed part-time professional terms in December 1956, but by this time, Barrell had already made three of his four appearances for Colchester. His final game came on 29 December 1956 in a 1–1 draw with Queens Park Rangers, bringing his total to one goal in four league appearances for Colchester.

On leaving Colchester, Barrell returned to non-league football with Clacton Town and then emigrated to New Zealand in 1963 where he played local football for Kamo Whangarei.

References

1932 births
Living people
Sportspeople from Colchester
English footballers
Association football wingers
Harwich & Parkeston F.C. players
Colchester United F.C. players
F.C. Clacton players
English Football League players